Lecithocera thaiheisana is a moth in the family Lecithoceridae first described by Kyu-Tek Park in 1999. It is found in Taiwan.

The wingspan is 19 mm. The forewings are greyish brown, broader toward termen and with sparsely scattered dark-brown scales, especially on the lower half and beyond two thirds length. There are two dark discal spots, the inner one is slightly smaller than the outer one. The hindwings are grey.

Etymology
The species name is derived from the type locality.

References

Moths described in 1999
thaiheisana